Whitcomb Glenn "Bunt" Speer (November 6, 1884 – April 24, 1955) was an American football and basketball coach.  He served as the head football coach at Fort Hays State University in Hays, Kansas from 1915 to 1918 and Nebraska State Normal School—now known as Peru State College–from  1919 to 1922, and Midland College—now known as Midland University—in Fremont, Nebraska from 1923 to 1924, compiling a career college football coaching record of 50–21–3.  Speer was also the head basketball coach at Nebraska State Normal from 1919 to 1923, tallying a mark of 71–22.

While coaching at Fort Hays, he led the Tigers to 12 consecutive victories from the second game in the 1916 season to seventh game in the 1917 season—a record that stands as of the conclusion of the 2007 season.  His 1915 and 1917 teams also are tied for the most consecutive games without being scored upon.

Speer died of a heart attack, on April 24, 1955, at a hospital in Manhattan, Kansas.

Head coaching record

Football

References

1884 births
1955 deaths
Fort Hays State Tigers football coaches
Fort Hays State Tigers men's basketball coaches
Kansas State Wildcats football coaches
Kansas State Wildcats football players
Midland Warriors football coaches
Peru State Bobcats football coaches
Peru State Bobcats men's basketball coaches
College men's basketball head coaches in the United States